Da Gama Park is a suburb of the City of Cape Town in the Western Cape province of South Africa.

Da Gama Park was founded as a township in the former Simon's Town district, north-west of the town. Situated in the Else River Valley, it was established for men of the Navy and their families. It was named after Vasco da Gama (?-1524), the Portuguese navigator.

References

Suburbs of Cape Town